Pyae Sone Naing (born 3 July 2001) is a footballer from Myanmar, and a striker for  Yadanarbon FC. He is the another product of Myanmar Football Academy.

References

 pyae sone naing
 

Living people
Burmese footballers
2001 births
Association football forwards
Yadanarbon F.C. players